Cigaritis scotti is a butterfly in the family Lycaenidae. It is found in Yemen and Oman.

References

Butterflies described in 1954
Cigaritis